The 1967–68 Yugoslav Second League season was the 22nd season of the Second Federal League, the second level association football competition of SFR Yugoslavia, since its establishment in 1946. The league was contested in two regional groups (West Division and East Division), with 18 clubs each. There were no teams relegated at the end of the season, as the league changed its format and from following season was divided in four groups with 16 clubs each.

West Division

Teams
A total of eighteen teams contested the league, including fourteen sides from the 1966–67 season, one club relegated from the 1966–67 Yugoslav First League and three sides promoted from the third tier leagues played in the 1966–67 season. The league was contested in a double round robin format, with each club playing every other club twice, for a total of 34 rounds. Two points were awarded for wins and one point for draws.

Čelik were relegated from the 1966–67 Yugoslav First League after finishing in the 16th place of the league table. The three clubs promoted to the second level were Belišće, Rudar Ljubija and RNK Split.

League table

East Division

Teams
A total of eighteen teams contested the league, including fourteen sides from the 1966–67 season, one club relegated from the 1966–67 Yugoslav First League and three sides promoted from the third tier leagues played in the 1966–67 season. The league was contested in a double round robin format, with each club playing every other club twice, for a total of 34 rounds. Two points were awarded for wins and one point for draws.

Sutjeska were relegated from the 1966–67 Yugoslav First League after finishing in the 15th place of the league table. The three clubs promoted to the second level were Bregalnica Štip, Sloga Kraljevo and Srem.

League table

See also
1967–68 Yugoslav First League
1967–68 Yugoslav Cup

Yugoslav Second League seasons
Yugo
2